Social development can refer to:
 Psychosocial development
 Social change
 Social development theory
 Social Development (journal)
 Social emotional development
 Social progress or social regress